This is a list of characters in the anime/manga series Air Gear.

Major teams

Kogarasumaru

 is a team formed by Itsuki Minami and his friends to further their favorite hobby of Air Treck skating. Their team ranking in the world of AT increases at a very rapid pace, giving Kogarasumaru worldwide fame. Their motto was 'Kill em' dead!'. Eventually, the leader Ikki is betrayed by his mentor Sora Takeuchi and Sora then forms Genesis. Kogarasumaru is now determined to win the Gram Scale Tournament and dominate all other teams with their strength alone. The team currently has 3 riders that are Kings: Itsuki Minami (Sky/Storm King), Kazuma Mikura (Flame King), and Agito Wanijima (Fang King). Of these three, only Agito currently possesses his Regalia, Aeon Clock having stolen the Flame Regalia from Kazuma and Itsuki being the Storm King of the newly formed Hurricane Road is still having his Regalia built, though they now also possess the Rumble and Wind Regalia. Kogarasumaru was unqualified for the Gram Scale tournament because Ikki lost their registration data. However, they had a chance to qualify by going against the permanently seeded team Inorganic Net, led by the former Fang King, Falco. Inorganic Net is actually a computer program developed by Falco that has exact copies of the former Sleeping Forest members before they had disbanded, and each one possesses one of the original 8 regalia. During this battle, Kogarasumaru manages to outwit the former Sleeping Forest, and the victory is granted to Kogarasumaru by Emily's efforts. After this victory, Kogarasumaru wins their first Gram Scale bout against Highway Circus. While celebrating their victory, Benkei (of the AT syndicate Trident) arrives on a motorcycle, missing her right leg and carrying the Rumble Regalia. Kogarasumaru then battles against Sleipnir, a team made up of Wing Road riders.

Itsuki Minami

Voiced by: Kenta Kamakari (Japanese, TV), Nobuhiko Okamoto (Japanese, OVA); Chris Patton (English, ADV dub), Scott Evans (English, Animax Asia dub)

He is introduced to ATs by Noyamano family, whom he lives with due to his parents' disappearance. He eventually forms Kogarasumaru, and takes on the Trophaeum. Ikki is often characterized as a crow due to a small crow, Kūu, using his hair as a nest.

Ikki is able to see the Wing Road, and his peers often consider him to be the best candidate to become the next Sky King. He possesses two passive traits known as Hawk Eye and Trick Pass, which allow him to easily survey an area and utilize any part of it. Both are considered attributes necessary for a candidate to be Sky King. He trains under Sora to better utilize the wind, and he eventually obtains the incomplete Wind Regalia. He is able to use it to move quickly and fly, though he is unable to properly use its destructive power. The regalia is stolen by Sora and Nike, who are revealed to be antagonists harboring a grudge against Sleeping Forest. This leaves Ikki despondent and depressed, until Kazu reveals a message left behind by Spitfire after his death. Spitfire questions if Ikki has really "lost his wings," which leads to Ikki to be proclaimed the "Storm King of the Hurricane Road" by his Principal in Chapter 169. His tuner, Kururu Sumeragi, promises that she will complete a new regalia for him. Recently, the Gram Scale Tournament has begun, but it was revealed that Ikki failed to submit the final registration. It is later revealed that Kazu has found a way to gain them entry into the Grand Scale Tournament by challenging Falco, the former Fang King and a member of the original Sleeping Forest. After defeating Falco's team, which was in fact a computerized version of the first Sleeping Forest, Kogarasumaru was awarded Falco's "eternal seed" in the tournament roster and entered the Gram Scale Tournament. He is best friends with Kazuma Mikura, the two are like brothers and care about each other more than anything else.

Ikki is a very upbeat, zany person, who seemingly is as eccentric as just about everyone else in the universe of Air Gear. He delights in eating meat, a privilege he is often deprived of in the Noyamano household. He is rash, impulsive, and determined to do everything his way, whether for good or bad. In battle, he either comes off as his ordinary crazy and unpredictable personality, or his more serious, cold and steely side, which other characters have described as a rare occurrence, and as an intimidating scene. Ikki is totally hooked onto Air Trekking. He treats his ATs with care to such a standard that even his sisters feel jealous of, and his mind is constantly on Air Trekking; for example, during the Kyoto trip he fails to notice Ringo's affection initially, deadset on figuring out a 'Windmill Theory' that another Storm Rider has revealed to him as the secret behind the Rumble King. Ikki is a self-proclaimed genius and is very proud of himself, in particular his fighting abilities. In truth, he works very hard behind the others' backs, as is revealed when Kuu brings his friends to his secret training area, where the scars left over by his training could be seen in chapter 87.

Though his attitude can be described as a lowlife, suitable for his gangster-like persona, and though he likes to go around doing insanely foolish things all the time, Ikki has a tendency to think beyond others' perceivable concept and at several intervals can spout deep philosophy that more often than not will impact others. One such incident was the Pomtemkin brothers' battle, where Ikki's plan caused an initial falling out among the Kogarasumaru, where in fact he had his own solution around that matter. Ikki, though easy to miss the obvious, can be very adept when it comes to spotting small details. In their first Parts War, he alone had noticed that Kazu's ATs were the most worn out among them, a mark of how much he practiced.

He is noticed to be developing a new skill, as Kururu noticed that his AT was worn out. The day came for the Sleeping Forest and the Genesis to fight, Ringo went to the place where Ikki and his gang stayed and revealed her true feelings for Ikki while dressed as Croissant Mask. He told Simca if they could meet at the usual place, where the first time he loved ATs. In recent chapters, it's revealed that the trick Ikki was developing was called "Null Wind". It combines the power of all the major riders of Kogarasumaru and creates a storm of wind around Ikki, that stops all wing road riders tricks. With this, Ikki is able to win his battle against Sleipnir.

There are three main women who have feelings/interests for Ikki first one being Ringo who he had always considered a sister (not blood related) but changed after he battled with her and realized she has feelings for him, Simca takes a huge interest in Ikki from the moment she met him, at one point wanted to become Ikki's tuner and finally Kururu who begins to develop feelings for Ikki this starting when he was hospitalized and eventually becomes his official tuner due to the tradition of the Sky King and Oath Queen pairing up. All three have feelings for him, although recently Ikki has shown signs of love towards Ringo.

A lot of the Gravity Children, members of Sleipnir, brain chargers all regard a certain person called Dr/Mr/Uncle "Minami"; which is the same family name as Ikki. He is said to know most about what is in the top of the tower and the Sky Regalia.

When Kururu wasn't able to be his link tuner because of her condition, Ikki suggests and chooses Ringo to be his substitute tuner since she has always been the one closest to him. Ringo confesses her love again and they kiss. Ikki then goes on to become the one true Sky King and gains the Sky Infinity Atmosphere, which allows him to nullify the planet's gravitational field.

 Tricks
 Spinning Wallride Overbank 1800°
 UPPER SOUL 23Roll
 Method Air to Spin That Grab Moonride
 Backward Cross Ridefall Upper Fang: "TWINCAM"
 Roof Gap To Disaster One Foot "Air line"
 Pile Tornado
 Relies on the "Vacuum Welding" skill to produce the effects of Tornadogenesis, funneling the air to such consistency that Ikki's kick produces a violent tornado. Ikki can ride the inner contours of the tornado - called the Limited Express - for increased momentum.
 Moonstruck Numberless Grappler: The Wind Infinity Atmosphere. This trick is one of the best Ikki has, despite the fact that he utterly despises using it due to its lethality. It creates a localized hurricane which picks up debris and fires it at his opponent, creating a massive wall of destruction that cuts, impales, and smashes into his opponent.
 Null Wind
 A Windless Barrier - "ASTRAL MAGUS": The Storm Infinity Atmosphere, despite having been displayed against Takeuchi Sora WITHOUT the use of the Storm Regalia itself. It's a solo version of the Null Wind trick.

Kazuma Mikura 
Voiced by: Kenn (Japanese, TV), Miyu Irino (Japanese, OVA); Clint Bickham (English, ADV)

, known as Kazu to his friends, is a childhood friend of Ikki who becomes influenced to take up AT and join Kogarasumaru. He is originally bullied by Ikki as a child, and he often feels like Ikki are more important than anything to him. In the manga, Kazu owns a Chihuahua named Chiwa. He takes up running at a later point, which eventually leads to him being an exceptionally fast AT rider. As he shows signs of following the Flame Road, Spitfire takes an interest in him and eventually proclaims Kazu to be the next Flame King. He is given the Flame Regalia before Spitfire's death, Kazu soon discovers this during his challenge to be the hero who saves the fallen from hell. Kazu soon realizes that he truly wants to fight against Ikki and they began their battle. Kazu fights an amazing battle against Ikki. Though it seems that Ikki had gained the upper hand, he left the fight a draw. Kazu was very satisfied with how he had become close to Ikki's level. It has been revealed that Kazu has adopted not only Spitfire's techniques, such as Afterburner, but also Aeon Clock's Time Manipulation, which he has been taught by the advanced training program left in Spitfire's ATs. Kazu has recently copied a trick called "Flame Lens" from his opponent. This allows him to create an illusion of himself and Agito and win them their fight. This trick is considered to be above special A-class and is a very powerful technique for a (tentative) king to use without regalia. In Chapter 320, Kazu was told about the true power of Flame Regalia by Spitfire. Flame Regalia's cyberairspace has the ability to record the "memory of runs" of every rider. So, a flame king can utilize the ability of other riders easily.

Kazu is unaware of Emily's feelings for him and maybe does not reciprocate them, but he does show special attention to her from time to time, like rescuing her bracelet when a rival threw it into a river, holding her hand after the team was defeated by the White Wolves or hugging her after she retrieves the balloon in the match against Inorganic Net (former Sleeping Forest).

 Tricks
 Super Stride IV "Sonic Boom"
 AFTER BURNER
 This Trick takes advantage of direct power injection to the A-T's wheel motor resulting in a significant increase of thrust and supersonic takeoff.
 TIME
 Learned from Spitfire's VR program. It restricts an individual's movement with precision kicks and palm thrusts targeting the vital nerve points on the chin, back of the head and bottom of the neck, effectively diminishing a person's freedom of movement. Individuals experience impaired vision, haziness, and sensations of burning paralysis.
 AGITO & AKITO × KAZU Grand Fang Fire Bird
 This trick combines elements from Agito & Akito's Bloody Blade Fang and Kazu's Flame Road to produce a fiery ->Fang<-.
 FLAME LENS
 HOLE NINE HEAVEN'S DOOR [Ættir]
 This trick turns every data that had been recorded inside the Flame Regalia's memory (Lon Houtz Bourne Street) into anything. In the battle with Nike, Kazu can use Aeon's Thorn Whip, Yoshitsune's Rumble Windmill, Onigiri's Organic Nitrogen, and even Nike's Gem.

Issa Mihotoke
Voiced by: Hitoshi Bifu (Japanese, TV), Kenta Miyake (Japanese, OVA); Mark Laskowski (English, ADV)

Before he became part of Kogarasumaru, he is the leader of the team , which is defeated by Ikki. He appears to be obese, but his body is only ten percent fat. His size is actually caused by a large amount of blood pooling in his gut from overeating. He also has the ability to manipulate that blood and send it to his muscles, causing him to temporarily have a slimmer, cut figure and even cause his limbs to become longer. He uses brass knuckles-esque gloves in combat, which combined with his superhuman strength is truly devastating. Spitfire states that Buccha has the skills to potentially rival that of a King's, but because of his brash actions in battle, he cannot utilize them fully. To overcome this, he underwent Buddhist training with his father, and has come to trust his heart as well as his teammates more. This is displayed in the virtual battle with the former Sleeping Forest, in which he is able to hold back the physically strongest of the kings by himself. He also learns how to further control his bloodflow, now able to direct it into his legs in order to hugely increase his speed. He eventually earns the title of Mountain King after defeating Orca in an underwater deathmatch.

Onigiri
Voiced by: Masami Kikuchi (Japanese, TV) Shintaro Ohata (Japanese, OVA); Greg Ayres (English, ADV)

 is one of Ikki's childhood friends who joins Kogarasumaru. His parents run a bad Chinese restaurant. He rides on a single AT by sitting upside down on it, mainly to look up the skirts of his female schoolmates. This proves useful during Kogarasumaru's battle against Behemoth, when Onigiri fights against Ryō Mimasaka who uses her tattoos on her body to hypnotize her opponents, but since Onigiri is looking at her tattoos from an upside-down angle, he remains unaffected and is able to defeat her. He has an unusual way of using his perspiration, usually during overall perverted moments, to create illusions, which he nicknames the "Smell Road". Though Ikki is perverted as well, he is nowhere near to being perverted as Onigiri. Although he appears weak, when he pushes himself to his limits he can fight evenly with a King as seen in the team battle with the Virtual Sleeping Forest. His skill was enough to intimidate even Kilik and Rika Noyamano. Kogarasumaru's first win in the Gram Scale Tournament is in part due to Onigiri's sweat dripping all over the course, causing the leader of the Highway Circus team to slip.

Akito/Agito/Lind Wanjima
Voiced by: Kokoro Kikuchi (Japanese, TV), Ryoko Shiraishi (Japanese, OVA); Blake Shepard (English, ADV), Andrea Kwan (English, Animax Asia)

They are originally part of the Wind SWAT team, in which they are treated like a tool by their older brother, Kaito. Ikki eventually saves them, and they join Kogarasumaru. They switch who is in control by using an eye patch. Akito is innocent and non-violent. He becomes attracted to Ikki, much to Ikki's discontent. He states he was the original Fang King until he became disgusted with himself and became unable to use AT. Agito then appears and starts using ATs, while following his own violent and bloodthirsty nature. He tends to swear/cuss a lot and uses four hooks dangling from straps on his legs to battle and tear people apart. When equipped with the Fang Regalia, he releases a pressurized "Fang" through the instantaneous acceleration and braking of the A-T's wheel motors, vacuuming and compressing air into a piercing shock wave. As the manga develops, Agito grows to respect Ikki and his strength. In some scenes in the manga, Agito is shown to be very weak while sleeping, so much that the guys put him in some very humorous scenes because of his weakness. Added info about his weakness is about his physique. It's obvious that he is thin and short, and that the only reason why he is strong is because of motivation, willpower, and pride. It is also learned that Akito had been acting as Agito's tuner up until now. However, he wasn't able to fully hear his own biorhythm, only allowing him to keep his other half's A-T and Regalia barely operational. Because roughly 76% of the Fang Regalia was not operational, Agito had difficulty with fully utilizing his "Fangs". It isn't until Yayoi tunes him that the Fang Regalia is fully operational and complete.

 Tricks
 AGITO Ride fall Bloody roll, soul 1800°
 Backward Cross Ridefall Upper Fang: "TWINCAM"
 A surprise tag-team attack.
 AGITO Bloody fang Ride fall "Leviathan"
 AGITO Bloody Blade Fang
 Bloody Road ->Saucer Crush<-
 AGITO & AKITO × KAZU Grand Fang Fire Bird

Another personality, emerges during the battle with Orca. He claims to be the original personality and he is much stronger than the other two, utilizing the Fang Regalia on a different level. He is a "brain charger", or a person who has been "charged" with the ability of gravity children. Lind's eyes have crosses on them, similar to those of gravity children, but his eyes have two crosses, with one set at a 45 degree angle and overlaid over the other. He does not care for others. It is unknown if he has any feelings at all towards anyone, including Akito and Agito Wanijima, though he has displayed more human compassion towards the then-incapacitated Yayoi Nakayama, yet, is revealed "fake affection" after Orca falsely hit Yayoi in the face, that Lind said, "Aren't there 4 more billion of that kind? If so, then, I don't need her...". She kissed him in chapter 194, while battling Orca underwater, to give him air so that he could continue battling. It is revealed by Thor of Slepinir that Lind found the "original" sky king, with the "answer". In chapter 291 it is revealed that Lind is brain charger #0 and his personality is basically a clone of the first Thorn Queen, "The Wings of Beginnings"-Gazelle. It was shown in flashbacks that Gazelle and Kaito met and started a relationship, but were relentlessly pursued by the Takeuchi brothers, ultimately resulting in Gazelle's death. In Trick 300, it is revealed that Gazelle was pregnant when she died and the fetus was removed and artificially enhanced by a mysterious benefactor. The child later appeared to Kaito with a note, thus making Agito/Akito/Lind, Kaito's son, not his brother.

Emily Adachi
Voiced by: Shoko Ishii (Japanese, TV), Yu Kobayashi (Japanese, OVA); Kira Vincent-Davis (English, ADV), Candice Moore (English, Animax Asia)

 is part of the track team. She and other members of the team are initially forced to harass Ikki by Buccha team. After it disbands, she and Yayoi become supporters of Kogarasumaru. She has a large crush on Kazu, and tries to tend to him when possible. Her family owns a Banana business. She eventually joins the Kogarasumaru and acts as back-up, though her skills are unpolished. She has the strength and endurance of a man, much to the surprise of her opponents (even Kilik), which she refers to as "The Power of Love".

She plays a crucial part in Kogarasumaru's entry into the Gram Scale tournament, acting as the 'Panther' in an A-class virtual reality battle against a simulated former Sleeping Forest team. It is her grasping of the coveted balloon that ends the game in Kogarasumaru's favor.

Yayoi Nakayama
Voiced by: Rieko Yoshimoto (Japanese, TV), Saori Hayami (Japanese, OVA); Stephanie Wittels (English, ADV)

 is initially forced to harass Ikki by Buccha's team, though she supports Kogarasumaru later. Nakayama has the ability to communicate with Ikki's crow and to tell the exact time, down to a second - a trait that is shared amongst the more affluent tuners of Tool Toul To. It was first seen that she has a crush on Ikki on the chapter against the SabelTigers but after the trip to Kyoto she lost interest in him. Her father owns Nakayama Construction. It was said by Ine Makigami that she saw potential in Yayoi as an AT-Tuner, she even mistook Yayoi as the team's tuner. In fact, during Kogarasumaru's battle against the original Sleeping Forest in Inorganic Net, when Agito gets injured, she is the one who tunes him back to health and finally completes the Fang Regalia that had been merged into his A-T.

Agito never seems to recognize Yayoi without her braids, always yelling who she is whenever she bothers him with her hair down. While in training camp, Yayoi fretted over Agito who was overworking himself to produce a stronger Fang. Emily convinced her to kidnap him while he was asleep and bring him somewhere relaxing to help soothe him. Oddly, when Agito woke up (tied up) on a boat in the middle of the lake with Yayoi, he didn't insult her or use his usual profanity, instead keeping quiet while she told him a story about the lake. When Lind appeared during the underwater battle against Orca, she kissed him to give him her air. Orca, annoyed at her interference, slashed her face with his AT, after which Lind complained that Yayoi wasn't that important to him in the first place.

Yayoi has recently become Agito's tuner but she mostly acts as an observer during Kogarasumaru's battles.

Sleeping Forest
The current  is led by Ringo, the Thorn Queen. Its purpose is to make sure that the Sky Regalia stays within the Trophaeum by winning the Gram Scale Tournament.

Ringo Noyamano
Voiced by: Mariya Ise (Japanese, TV), Haruka Tomatsu (Japanese, OVA); Luci Christian (English, ADV), Andrea Kwan (English, Animax Asia)

 is successor of Sleeping Forest and the Thorn Queen, of the Sonia Road. She is a second generation gravity child and the only one completely unaffected by pressure in the Trophaeum due to the pressure which the Sonia Road exerts on the user's body, leading to her being undefeated there. Her Sonia Road gives her graceful and deadly agility that eventually takes its toll on her body, except when inside of the 'forest' of Trophaeum. She is in love with Ikki, but she is unable to relay her feelings. This also makes it hard for her to fulfill her purpose as Sleeping Forest's leader while supporting Ikki. She helps Kogarasumaru in times of trouble under the guise of Croissant Mask, even coming to Kogarasumaru's aid when it was revealed that Ikki's negligence had prevented the team from registering.

Ringo is a kind, studious girl who wears thick glasses, always there to support Ikki since they were young. She started out with a sisterly affection for Ikki, which eventually progressed to infatuation and eventually deep love, which she still tries to deny though it is clear to everyone except perhaps Ikki himself. Ringo has always let Ikki do things as he liked, turning an eye away during his gangster era as the leader of Eastside 'Undefeatable Babyface'. She is a pushover, her friends Emily and Yayoi easily manipulating her to doing things for them, and the teachers always picking on her rather than Ikki and gang. However, as a Storm Rider she is more strong-willed as a person, and punishes the Skull Saders, who attacked Ikki, with the other members of the Noyamano household, for misusing ATs.

Ringo, encumbered by her duty as the leader of the Sleeping Forest, is put in a difficult position, due to the power struggle between Sleeping Forest, who seeks to protect the Sky Regalia, and Genesis, who seeks to take the Sky Regalia. She was put in a dilemma when Ikki was given reign over Genesis; since that directly made him her enemy. Ikki taking over Genesis caused Sleeping Forest to respond in kind, attacking and paralyzing Simca, who had recruited Ikki, waistdown. Ringo led the attack as the true successor of the Sleeping Forest, 'Crazy Apple'.

'Crazy Apple' was eventually fully brought out when Ikki learns the truth behind Simca's attack, followed shortly by Ringo's unwanted kiss with her tuner Kanon. After realizing that Ikki had reached a level of riding where he was a serious threat to Sleeping Forest, she put herself in battle with a serious Ikki, and decided to crush him and remove him forcibly from the world of ATs, so that he would not die by getting caught in between.

The Ringo when she is 'Crazy Apple' seems to be an entirely different person, taunting, cold, and ferocious in her attacks. She mocks Ikki for his little tricks and doesn't hold back in all her attacks, even releasing the Thorn Regalia with the intention of taking Ikki down. She destroyed Ikki's Infinity Atmosphere because he was armed with the fake Wind Regalia, though she took equal damage in return. Her infinity atmosphere is called " 'Infinite Chain' Turquoise Sonia"

Eventually Ikki came to understand Ringo to a level where words were not needed and after Ringo fell, exhausted from the race, he picks her up and told her he forgives her and thanked her for going easy on Simca. He then finished the race with a draw, carrying Ringo all the way to the end point of the race. Ringo later learns that Ikki was going to leave the Noyamano household to pursue his own path (and to prevent a recurrence of such events) and Ringo acknowledges his path and let him 'go outside his cage to find his wings'. Before he left, Ringo finally confessed to Ikki.

Just before the battle against Genesis, Sora reveals a captive Rika and is trying to force the team to give up their advantage in the forest. Ringo, as leader, decides to abandon Rika in favor of keeping their advantage. This puts her at odds with Mikan, who believes they should go rescue their sister.

When Mikan decides to go help out Rika despite knowing that her life is in considerable danger, Ringo forces Mikan to duel with her in order for Mikan to leave to help Rika, because Mikan would face certain death if she went against Genesis alone.

Ikki, eavesdropping on their conversation, decides to help them out by going out himself to save Rika. This reinforces Ringo's love for Ikki and she realizes that Ikki has always been there for her in her time of need. In the moment for the tuning of Ikki's regalia, with Kururu unable to do it, Ikki chose her to do it because she's the girl that always be by his side and the only one that really knows him in that way she became Ikki's Link Tuner.

Mikan Noyamano
Voiced by: Seika Hosokawa (Japanese); Shelley Calene-Black (English, ADV), Emily Woo Zeller (English, Animax Asia)

 is the second eldest of the Noyamano sisters and a gravity child. She is a fiery-tempered tomboyish girl with short messy hair, and the disciplinarian of the group. She often beats up Ikki with her wrestling moves. She has a soft spot for retro games, something which Simca uses to initially gain her favor.

Just before the battle against Genesis, Sora reveals a captive Rika and is trying to force the team to give up their advantage in the forest. Mikan is the only one who chooses to save Rika over keeping their advantage, even going so far as to quit the team in order to do so. She mentions that if it were Rika alone who was in danger, she wouldn't bother saving her, but because Rika was pregnant, she would do anything to save her. She also states that she just wants Rika to be happy, countering her previous statements for saving her.

She is constantly referred to as a gorilla, due to her brute strength and irritable personality.

Also known as Wind God "FuuJin" in the Sleeping forest at the newest chapter, who runs Gale road.

Shiraume Noyamano
Voiced by: Yukiko Hanioka (Japanese); Hilary Haag (English, ADV), Candice Moore (English, Animax Asia)

, known as Ume to her family, is the youngest of the sisters. Her hobby is the creation of puppets in the guise of gorgons, and she's always seen carrying one with her. She is supposedly the weakest member of Sleeping Forest in terms of AT fighting skills, though as a gravity child, she is able to battle extremely well in the Tropheum.

Ume is the youngest child in the Noyamano family, being only 10 years old, and thus is more doted on among the sisters. She keeps to herself for the most part, playing with her weird dolls, which she apparently makes herself. Her personality is more quiet and passive as compared to her aggressive sisters, and she seems to have eccentric tastes. She wears a strange eye patch in her hair and is often dressed in long-sleeved dresses that is much too large for her it seems. As with the other Noyamano sisters, she dotes on Ikki like a part of their family, though Ringo is the only one to have stepped from a brotherly-sisterly love to a romantic relationship in the family.

Though she is the weakest of the Gravity Children, she can easily defeat Ikki in the Tropheum, due to her being accustomed in fighting in 0G, though, this was in a comical context and therefore, her true capability is unknown. She is often bullied on by Ikki, which she often holds grudges, but loves him all the same. She introduced Ikki to the 'Sensei' who designed Kogarasumaru's emblem and Team Shirts.

It has been confirmed that Ume is a Ring Road rider, and it is likely that she could use it in an offensive manner like Kanon does. Her skill with technology is shown to be of extraordinary standards, from creating a 'rocket AT' for Ikki early in the manga (which was scrapped due to her not being in her right senses at that time) to creating strange spiderlike robotic machines which she uses to travels on. Her speed is shown to be on par with genius Tuner Kururu, as they both repaired the robot they were riding on the second it was dismantled by a Time Road user.

Gabishi
 is the current Horn King who has a penchant for removing large amounts of flesh from faces of his victims using his AT's "Hatch-Venom." His regalia is able to push the heat resulting from a sudden stop into an "Air Cannon". This attack is made by kicking the air twice in rapid succession, generating the heat in the first kick and sending it towards his opponent in the next. The attack looks like a laser that is even able to melt giant holes in metal billboards, slightly similar to Agito's Fangs.

He had chased Kazu and Emily, mistaking Kazu for Ikki and intending to kill him. However, Aeon Clock stops him and fights him, but is overwhelmed. While Kazu was debating on what to do, Emily stepped forward and attacked Gabishi with brute strength. Surprised, Gabishi stops the battle and attempts to say something to Emily but was interrupted when Nue punched Gabishi and ended up catching him. Gabishi was the opponent who had defeated Rising Road's Nue, but Nue rematched against him later and defeated him.

Ohm
 is the current Water Queen. Using the Lather Road, she can saturate air into water with her regalia, which allows her to utilize an attack called "Bubblegum Crisis." She can only attack from the rear, which forces her to face backwards in order to attack. She creates giant bubbles which she usually uses to surround her opponents to finish them off. When the bubbles explode they cause the water in the opponents body to vibrate causing internal damage, which she used to paralyze Simca. They can also be used for defense by gathering them in one spot to block an opponents attack. She likes sweet food, especially lollipops, and strong men.

Kilik
 See Kilik from Original Sleeping Forest

Original Sleeping Forest

Sora Takeuchi
Voiced by: Mitsuru Miyamoto (Japanese, TV), Kenichi Suzumura (Japanese, OVA); Vic Mignogna (English, ADV), David Lee McKinney (English, Animax Asia)

 is the founder of the original Sleeping Forest, the first Wind King, and the main antagonist. He is a Gravity Child who wishes to find the Sky Regalia, so he spreads the initial rumor of the Regalia's existence and creates the team for that purpose. He is generally carefree and extremely perverted, though he is later revealed to be cold and manipulative. He is eventually betrayed by Kilik, after he finds out that Sora had ulterior motives, as he wished to use the Sky Regalia to take control of the world, and had manipulated the information on the Tower. The ensuing battle and defeat leads to his loss of the Wind Regalia and the use of his legs, as well as several defections from Sleeping Forest. He continues to use a wheelchair full-time for six years while waiting for an opportune time to put his plans into motion once again.

As the one-time leader of Sleeping Forest, he was romantically involved with Rika, a relationship which ended following Kilik's coup d'état that left Sora permanently using a specially customized AT-wheelchair. Sora began to mentor Ikki at the request of Rika and in the process rekindled their shattered romance. Though initially interested in grooming Ikki into an accomplished successor, Sora soon reveals Ikki is just a means to obtain a newly finished Wind Regalia and begins implementing new plans for global dominance, although it was also said that If Ikki obtained the completed Wind Regalia and became the Wind King, he would have been a rider not even Sora could have defeated. This turn-of-events also brought to light numerous revelations including his AT-tuned biomechatronics legs and a twin brother, Nike. After attaining the Sky Regalia and becoming the Sky King, Sora reveals that his actions are based in his all-consuming nihilistic hatred of humanity, as he sees them as nothing but willing slaves who he, as their new god, must lead and control. At the climax of the series, Sora defeats the current and former Sleeping Forest but is finally defeated by Ikki, who becomes the true Sky King. He is last seen in prison and wheelchair-bound once more.

Rika Noyamano
Voiced by: Naoko Matsui (Japanese, TV), Rina Satou (Japanese, OVA); Christine Auten (English, ADV), Emily Woo Zeller (English, Animax Asia)

 is the eldest of the Noyamano sisters. She acts like a typical older sister and takes care of the family. To support her sisters and Ikki, she works as Destler Bartlett, a female pro-wrestler. During the time when Ikki discovers AT, she is out on a national tour with her wrestling promotion. Unknown to Ikki at first, she is the former Thorn Queen of the original Sleeping Forest, which required her to utilizes her hip joints as the base of her moves. The disadvantage of her Sonia Road was that it took quite a toll on her body, making her tire easily. She is one of two members of the original Sleeping Forest that is not a Gravity Child, the other being Ine. Throughout her entire stay in Sleeping Forest and afterwards, she was unaware of the significance of the Sky Regalia and the true intentions of Sora. She was initially Sora's girlfriend, though they fell apart after Kilik's betrayal. She also quits using AT, and she initially fears that Ikki will suffer the same fate as Sora if he continues to be a Storm Rider, although she is finally convinced of his talent after a strange battle with him and a team consisting of Sora and his dogs. She and Sora talk often afterward and eventually reconnect, and she is eventually impregnated with his child.

In her youth Rika was displayed as a lone ranger who achieved the right to use the Thorn Regalia in her early teens by herself, even though she was not a Gravity Child. She battled off opposing enemies aiming for her title as the Thorn Queen and aimed to take down all the teams in the area alone. In addition, she found the means to support her large family by herself, though they were bordering poverty. On one of her fights she met Sora, who she christened as the '120 Yen', for the iced coffee he bought her. Sora appeared as one of her fans, and later became her companion and friend. On one occasion, she revealed to Sora that she had caught wind of a group who was reputedly composed of the strongest Kings of the era, and wanted to take them down. Only upon arrival of the battlefield did she find out that the team was none other than Sora's Sleeping Forest, and that he was the leader, the man closest to becoming Sky King at that time. Sora extended his offer to include her on the team, and because she desired to remain at Sora's side, she complied.

After joining, Rika was romantically involved with Sora, which was also a major cause for Kilik's jealousy. When Kilik declared betrayal upon Sora, she was not present for the battle on either side, presumably because she was uninformed by both Sora and Kilik, who had only recently confessed to her the previous night. She arrived too late to find the battle already over, Kilik the winning party, Sora and his supporters beaten and robbed of their Regalia. Sora, grievously injured by the battle in both legs, lost hope and broke up with Rika, leaving her the Sleeping Forest emblem, which she passed down to her sister Ringo later.

Afraid of a repeat of the same incidence, present-day Rika attempted to stop Ikki from going down the same road as Sora, as she had already recognized Ikki as bearing many similar traits to Sora. This is further encouraged by Ikki's climbing of Tokyo Tower when he was a child, which resulted in him falling off and getting carried away by the eight-winged crow. Having already seen the signs in Ikki, she often approached Sora to talk about him; in fact Sora has commented before that she has only ever come to look for him to talk about Ikki since the day they parted. Rika tries to stop Ikki from AT-ing by challenging him in a match, but is defeated when Ikki exceeds her expectations. She then recognizes Ikki's strength, and supports his goal from that day on, though she still takes care to limit Ikki by locking his body with heavy weights, which Ikki grows accustomed to quickly.

Rika has sworn off ATs, though she still retains her skills from her prime. She does not play a role in the current power struggle in the AT world, though she is shown to be aware of it. Some evidence is that she guessed Kanon's motives in aggravating Ringo and Ikki into a fight, and that she advised Ringo to make up her mind about Ikki, who would surely become an enemy to Sleeping Forest in the future. However, there are no signs that she knows about Sora retaking his place as Wind King and making use of Ikki. Whether this is because Sora is keeping this from her or if she does not want to talk about it is unknown.

Just before the battle against Genesis, Sora reveals a captive Rika and is trying to force the current Sleeping Forest to give up their advantage in the forest. Mikan is the only one to choose to save Rika and also reveals that their sister is pregnant, which is all the more reason to rescue her. Sora later brainwashes her and she assists Sora in battling Ikki and Ringo.

Rika is a brain charger, the back-up 'copy' of Gazelle (revealed in chapter 319). Rika was likely made into a back-up shortly after Gazelle was made, hence the lack of memories and emotion that Gazelle had gained and passed onto her son Akito/Agito. It was also due to her being this 'back-up copy' that Sora had (indirectly) given her the Thorn Regalia after Gazelle's death and later got her to join SF.

Falco
Voiced by: Hiroki Yasumoto (Japanese)

Falco is the original Fang King and a Gravity Child. He is originally a slim and slender blond, who wears a fine suit and bowler hat. He is capable of firing several "solid" Fangs simultaneously without injury. He quits after the destruction of Sleeping Forest and becomes a weak visual novel playing old man with a pot belly who no longer interacts with the outside world in any meaningful way. Falco holds the Gram Scale Tournament's "Eternal Seed", meaning he always has a reserved spot in the tournament as the team "Inorganic Net". Inorganic Net is a digital copy of the original Sleeping Forest within a computer. He also has the authority to give his spot to others, given they're capable of defeating Inorganic Net. Falco was responsible for the protection of Skylink (for an unknown duration of time), which is a component of the Sky Regalia.

Dontores
Voiced by: Kenji Nomura (Japanese)

Dontores is the original Rumble King whose Regalia is placed on his forearms rather than the AT like Yoshitsune. He is considered the weakest member within Sleeping Forest by his teammates (though probably not including Ine). In the past, he was possibly a famous rapper, continuing to hold concerts during his time with Sleeping Forest. Using his regalia he manipulates the density in the air creating solid defensive walls that can push back his enemies, and in enclosed spaces he is able to use the echoes generated off the walls to amplify his power many times over. This helps him generate dense blasts of air to hammer at his opponents. It is called his "audience of the overroad" since the echoes respond like the audience of a crowd of tens of thousands of people. When not in use his regalia is disguised as a boom box which he carries across his shoulder.

Black Burn
Voiced by: Satoshi Hino (Japanese)

Black Burn is the original Thunder King whose Regalia uses artificial lightning as a destructive force as well as a wire system similar to Nue's. Apparently he has a son, as briefly mentioned by his copy during Sleeping Forest/Inorganic Net vs. Kogarasumaru fight. This son is later revealed to be Nue, the current Thunder King. After the fall of old Sleeping Forest, Black Burn became an alcoholic (one of the reasons for the strained relationship with his son) but continued air trek as the masked Hanged Man.

Spitfire
 See Genesis' Spitfire

Kilik
Voiced by: Koki Miyata (Japanese)

 is the former Gem King of the first Sleeping Forest. He is a gravity child along with his twin sister, Simca, and his childhood friend, Sora, and he is the most gifted of the first generation. While in Sleeping Forest, he develops a crush on Rika. He eventually learns that Sora has evil intentions, so he rebels against him with other gravity children. He defeats Sora, took away the Wind Regalia, and then loses his own regalia to Nike. He judges people using a one hundred point system with random variables. After Sora reappears in the AT world, he begins training in extreme pressure in order to stand up against him. He follows the Gaia Road, which, in his case, is able to memorize and finally engrave any riding script from a rider no matter how fast, high, and tricky it is.
He is seen training to become as hard as diamond. When he finally faces Sora once more, Kilik is held back by his memories of their former friendship and is killed handily, his last words being a declaration of his hatred, having realized that Sora is utterly irredeemable. Sora then defiles his corpse for fun before he begins his fight with Ikki.

Ine Makigami
Voiced by: Sayaka Ohara (Japanese)

 is the first Pledge Queen of Tool Toul To and of the original Sleeping Forest. She is also knowledgeable in medicine and runs her own hospital. Though none of the Gravity Children require tuners, Spitfire still has a close relationship with her before his death. She decides to break the rule of neutrality of Tool Toul To (along with many of its other members) and help Kogarasumaru develop. She passes down her title of Pledge Queen to Kururu Sumeragi.

Behemoth
 is a team with the strength of Class A riders, but stay Class-D by not winning the three wins required to advance. Their reason is so they can prey on other Stormrider teams.

Akira Udō
Voiced by: Kenji Nojima (Japanese); Michael Dalmon (English, ADV)

 is the leader of the team, developing it after leaving the Wind SWAT team and winning the Fang Regalia in a battle against Agito. He is highly skilled in the Bloody Road and was able to evolve the Fang attack into the more deadly Gigaer Cross, which overpowered Agito's Leviathan Fang (although Agito was performing the attack with normal ATs). He is defeated by Agito and Ikki, returns the Fang Regalia, and rejoins Wind. He is injured by the Takeuchi brothers afterward. His immense strength is the result of a genetic condition he was born with that means his muscles are up to nine times more dense than a normal humans. He shares this condition with Mitsuru Bando.

Mitsuru Bando
Voiced by: Hiro Yuuki (Japanese); David Wald (English, ADV)

, sometimes referred to as the "Cyclops Hammer", specializes in close combat, using his ultra-destructive punching power as his main weapon. When coupled with the speed of his AT, Mitsuru's punches result in damage of diabolical proportions. During the Behemoth VS Kogarasumaru challenge, he fights Ikki and is thoroughly defeated with a heavy body blow. With the arrest of Akira at the hands of the Wind SWAT team, Bandō now seeks to establish his own Storm Rider team. Mitsuru has a strange appearance, as his eyes are completely black. His immense strength is the result of a genetic condition he was born with, myostatin-related muscle hypertrophy, that means his muscles are up to seven times more dense than a normal humans. He shares this condition with Akira Udō.

Fuumei Goshogawara
Voiced by: Yasuyuki Kase (Japanese); Jay Hickman (English, ADV)

, known as the "Hecatonchires Bomb", dislocates his already long arms to attack opponents from a great distance and use them to grapple enemies. He is often characterized as a digger wasp.

Ryo Mimasaka
Voiced by: Miki Itou (Japanese); Elizabeth Byrd (English, ADV)

She is, however, defeated by Onigiri whose unorthodox style of riding on his head reverses the tattoo effects and makes him more powerful to the point where she submits to him instead. She is very close to Sano Yasuyoshi and may have romantic feelings for him, having known him from their school days, and works under him. She sacrifices herself to save Sano from being killed by Nike; though she is later revealed to be alive but on life-support and held hostage by Genesis in order to force Sano to work for them. In Chapter 161 it is revealed that she follows the path of the Gaia/Jade Road.

Yasuyoshi Sano
 See Genesis' Yasuyoshi Sano

Genesis
 is a massive team under the command of Simca. It is a conglomeration of numerous teams that have united under one banner, resulting in what is known to be the largest, and most powerful team in history. It is originally presented by Simca as a tool to overthrow the idea of the Trophaeumm, though it is later shown to be a creation of Nike to obtain the Sky Regalia along with Sora. Simca attempts to intervene by having Ikki become the Wind King and take control of Genesis, though the two brothers stop the plan.

Simca
Voiced by: Rie Tanaka (Japanese, TV), Ayako Kawasumi (OVA); Monica Rial (English, ADV)

She is the younger twin sister of Kilik and a first generation gravity child. She was part of Tool Toul To until after Sleeping Forest is destroyed and eventually works under Nike. She takes great interest in Ikki, whom she believes is destined to one day become the legendary Sky King. She eventually has her hair cut short, abandons her usual care-free attitude, and focuses on strengthening Ikki, all out of her new found love for him. She is soon attacked by Sleeping Forest, however, and temporarily placed into a wheelchair. After Sora and Nike take over, she attempts to help Kogarasumaru enter the tournament, and she and Ikki promise to ride together afterward. Ine once exclaimed that Kururu (The New Pledge Queen) had tuning abilities equal to Simca; Simca was meant to be the succeeding Pledge Queen after Ine, but she left Tool Toul To after the breakdown of the old Sleeping Forest.
Early in the manga, Ikki fell in love with her, and she constantly appears naked to him or allows him to hug her while she's naked as a reward. This is done much to Ringo's chagrin.

Spitfire
Voiced by: Kenjiro Tsuda (Japanese, TV), Tomokazu Seki (Japanese, OVA); Jay Hickman (English, ADV)

 is one of the gravity children, who escaped from the tower and is also said to be one of the gravity children to be gotten rid of, along with Nike and Sora. He is the first Flame King and one of the original members of Sleeping Forest. As the Flame King, he can ride at such high speeds that they create the illusion of flames due to the heat caused by the friction of his wheels on the ground. He can also create the illusion of stopping time, much like Yasuyoshi Sano, one of his former subordinates. Sometime after Sleeping Forest's defeat at the hands of Kilik, he joins Genesis and becomes Simca's close friend and advisor. He is in control of three teams and is a highly sought after hair stylist in everyday life. He begins to acknowledge Ikki after talking to Simca and witnessing some of his battles, such as the race with Buccha (whom he knew and advised well before he had any ties to Ikki and the rest of Kogarasumaru). He later takes an interest in Kazu and proclaims him to be the next Flame King after realizing the true purpose of Genesis and Takeuchi Sora and knowing that his own end might come near as a result of his betrayal. He and Sano eventually battle Sora and Nike using a combination of their styles known as the Apollo Road, though they lose and Spitfire is killed. He leaves behind the Flame Regalia and his will in the form of a video file that contains the truth about Genesis and an advanced training program that is able to recognize speech and react accordingly.

Nue
Voiced by: Miyu Irino (Japanese); Kyle Jones (English, ADV)

 is the Thunder King and a second generation Gravity Child. He leads the team "Black Crow", which is made up of twenty other, much younger second generation Gravity Children, who help him create illusions by manipulating the Earth's magnetic field. He has full body Regalia that manipulates electricity and magnetism, allowing him to create hallucinations and powerful electric attacks with a built-in wire system. Though he respects and occasionally helps Kogarasumaru, he remains with Genesis because Sora has promised to change the world enough to enable the Gravity Children under his care to live a normal life. In Trick 307, it is revealed that a rider named Hanged Man, who was able to counter the power of Nue's regalia, is his father. He battles Ikki aboard the aircraft carrier and loses, surrendering his Regalia's cores.

Yasuyoshi Sano
Voiced by: Hiroaki Hirata (Japanese, TV), Tomokazu Sugita (Japanese, OVA); John Gremillion (English, ADV)

He is originally part of Spitfire's team, following the same road, until he decides to leave and join Behemoth. After Behemoth's defeat, he joins with Genesis, serving as Simca's advisor, counselor, and occasional chauffeur. He eventually also serves Ikki and his team in the same manner. Although he is normally serious, he is often used as a comic relief, with his homosexuality being a recurring gag. He is very close to Mimasaka Ryo and may also be attracted to her, as he is apparently furious at the Takeuchi brothers after she is "killed", which is contrary to his usually calm and rational demeanor.

He is eventually shown to be working under his father's orders in an attempt to obtain the Sky Regalia, though he has his own goals. He helps Spitfire fight Sora and Nike though he is defeated and thought to be dead along with Spitfire. He is later shown to be alive and once again working for Genesis when he steals the Flame Regalia from Kazu, with no explanation to his apparent betrayal. However, the battle had left him scarred and with most of his body replaced with prosthetic, and Mimasaka on life support. After a confrontation with Sleeping Forest, a tracker on his body is inadvertently destroyed, and he reveals that Genesis had been using it to keep track of him. Free of listening ears, he asks Mikan to relay to Ikki that he is still loyal to him. However, because Genesis still has Mimasaka imprisoned, he cannot rejoin him. In recent chapters, he is shown fighting alongside Kazu and is killed off by Nike. Before the final blow, he hands over the Flame Regalia to Kazu.

Yoshitsune
Voiced by: Mitsuaki Madono (Japanese); Jason Douglas (English, ADV)

 is a brilliant, although somewhat eccentric, strategist who holds the title of Rumble King. He is the leader of the Kansai Storm Rider syndicate "Trident". His Regalia, "Ram Jet", is able to absorb wind, completely nullifying the "wind" of anyone and decreasing their air time. After Ikki impresses him by completing a challenge, he helps train and advise Kogarasumaru until Sora takes over Genesis. He decides to keep his alliance with Genesis as it will be beneficial to Trident and he wishes to one day fight against Kogarasumaru. He is a skilled Air Trekker, able to substitute empty cans as his Ram Jet Regalia and is an extremely skilled Tetris player. He is also capable of fighting on par with the Gravity Children. However, in the recent battle of Genesis vs. Trident, Yoshitsune has been confirmed to be dead. After destroying the mecha that invaded Osaka and killing the two members of Genesis, Gawain and Percival, Yoshitsune is unable to fight and is finished off by Nike.

Benkei
Voiced by: Wakana Yamazaki (Japanese); Robin Terry (English, ADV)

 is Yoshitsune's beautiful and skilled second-in-command. She is often portrayed as a panther because her fighting style and aggressive behavior both in and out of battle and is completely loyal to Yoshitsune and Trident. She becomes Kogarasumaru's trainer and extra member during Ikki's hospitalization period. During a match against another team, she fights Sleeping Forest's Water Queen, Om, and eventually overcomes her, with some help from Kazu. Recently, she is seen delivering Yoshitsune's bloodied "Rumble" Regalia to Kogarasumaru's headquarters with her right leg cut off. After completing this mission, she breaks down and cries. It is revealed she was the only survivor of the battle of Osaka in which Genesis exterminated Trident. Benkei actually cut her own leg off with a blade hidden within her Panther Corsa weapon to escape from the mecha that held her captive. She doesn't die from blood-loss since she's a proclaimed vegetarian.

Nike
 is the current Gem King and the most powerful of Genesis' four Kings. He lives in America and leads two teams. "Nike" is just an alias and, in actuality, he is the real leader of Genesis, and the identical twin brother of Sora Takeuchi, with whom he also shares his real name. He is mentally unstable, and has a deep hatred for the one who took everything away from his brother, the former Gem King, Kilik. Prior to this, Nike was the weakest and most cowardly Gravity Child, but was forged by Sora into a sadistic killing machine for the sake of his plans.
He is attracted to Simca (he even assaults her on one occasion) and is shown to be furious when Ikki asks her out on a date if he wins at the end of the Gram Scale Tournament. He also reveals (by mistake) to Rika that his cellphone has several perverted images of Simca.
His Jade road is a combination of the Wing Road and the Gaia Road and allows him to nullify damage and strengthen his own body greatly.
His Regalia can cause complete paralysis by sending vibrations that are completely opposite to one's own biorhythm through the ground. In recent chapters is it shown that Nike delivered the finishing blow to kill the leader of Trident, Yoshitsune. Nike is also seen holding Rika hostage in chapter 272 and in a flashback in 281 with shallot and Arthur and other gravity children. Nike was defeated by Kazu, armed with the Flame Regalia and his abilities as the new Flame King, during the raid on the battleship he and Sora had taken control of. Unable to handle his first ever loss, Nike mentally falls to pieces and becomes a vegetable. He is last seen in Simca's care, as she tries to undo what Sora did to him.

Orca
, whose real name is Vercingetorix, is a new member of Genesis who is a Gravity Child capable of using ATs underwater. He uses the Exploding Fang ability, which seems to be a fusion of Agito's Fang and Om's Bubblegum Crisis. He feels very alone on his road and seeks to find someone capable of defeating him. He eventually faces Agito and his other personality Lind, and he is eventually defeated. He seems relieved that he was finally defeated, and is later picked up by Genesis. He then faces Buccha in an underwater fight, and is defeated when Buccha slams him into the ocean floor. As he blacks out, he realized the reason that he lost twice was that he has always been alone and envies the fact that Issa has friends that he can rely on and fight for. He then joins Kogarasumaru and starts living at Issa's father's temple. As a Storm Rider, he is portrayed as a gigantic serpent- or dragon-like beast, similar to the Leviathan.

Caesar
 is a new member of Genesis who utilizes "Legionarius Phalanx", a move that uses blindingly fast kicks to send out numerous powerful blasts. He manages to use it to send fear into Agito, although he is soon defeated by him (with support from Akito). He tried to use a tank-like mechanical exoskeleton against Agito but was easily subdued by Orca, who got impatient while waiting to fight Agito. As a Storm Rider, he is portrayed as a legion of robotic soldiers in phalanx formation.

Tool Toul To
 is a team originally created to assist the kings with their Regalias. They are a completely neutral group and will assist any king regardless of which side they are on. Each king is assigned a tuner who becomes familiar with the king and acts as their personal tuner. Since the Regalia can be won from a king in battle, the new king would have trouble using the Regalia since the body structure of the old king might differ from the new one. That is where the members of Tool Toul To come in, as the new king will be assigned a tuner who will adjust the Regalia to the king's personal style and structure.

Kururu Sumeragi
Voiced by: Yukari Fukui (Japanese)

 is the leader of the current Tool Toul To and Pledge Queen. Initially, she was a new member keen on becoming Ikki's Tuner. Although shy around Ikki at first, she becomes devoted to him after witnessing his anger over Simca's attack. Kururu may be in love with Ikki as hinted in chapter 145. She does not wear ATs, but as the leader of Tool Toul To, she is a genius in repair, construction, and maintenance of ATs. In Ikki's battle with Ringo, Kururu identified the sound of Ikki's ATs, arrived at the battle in time to intercept Ikki as he was falling towards the river, and rebuilt his ruined ATs in midair in less than three seconds. She originally rebuilds the Wind Regalia for him, though it is stolen and given to Sora. She eventually becomes determined to create the new Storm Regalia for him. The Pledge Regalia allows her to utilize the bodies of other tuners through the 'Infinite Scale', enabling them to build, repair, and tune ATs as quickly as the Pledge Queen. In chapter 328 she reveals that she respects Ikki, but she doesn't want to be a part of his road because she wants to see the world with her eyes and so she can't be his link tuner. She created the Storm Regalia thanks to Ringo, Ikki's new link tuner.

Ine Makigami
 is the first Pledge Queen of Tool Toul To and of the original Sleeping Forest. She is also knowledgeable in medicine and runs her own hospital. Though none of the Gravity Children require tuners, Spitfire still has a close relationship with her before his death. She decides to break the rule of neutrality of Tool Toul To (along with many of its other members) and help Kogarasumaru develop. She passes down her title of Pledge Queen to Kururu Sumeragi.

Rune
Rune is the second in command of Tool Toul To and the oldest member of the team. He contains various robotic parts and keeps weapons on him at all times. Rune is also a Gravity Child, which is revealed in chapter 149.

Hako Isawa
Hako is an ordinary member of Tool Toul To who originally wants to become Ikki's tuner to prove her ability. She steals the original Bagram Cores (part of the Wind Regalia) that were repaired by Kururu Sumeragi and replaces them with her own copy. She later attempts to seduce Ikki, thus becoming his tuner, but she is dismissed as being inferior to Kururu and Simca. She is eventually kidnapped and becomes Sora's tuner. She regains her ties with her team afterwards and comes to terms with herself and her own feelings of inferiority.

Kanon
Voiced by: Yuki Kaji (Japanese)

 is Ringo's Tuner and Kururu Sumeragi's cousin. He has an obsession for Ringo and seems to harbor romantic intentions, but some of his ambitions shatter when he openly plots to tamper with Ikki's ATs. He presses on in his disregard for Tool Toul To's neutrality by actively battling against Kogarasumaru, though he at least seems to respect their leader.

Minor teams
 The Skull Saders are a team of riders that employ unfair tactics and extreme numbers to attack their opponents. They are defeated and forced to disband by Ikki. They are led by Magaki, a man with a bald head with a tattoo which is shaped like a skull with a crown-like jaw. He vows revenge against Ikki, though he is soon beaten and arrested by Agito. 
Magaki voiced by: Nobuyuki Hiyama (Japanese); Jason Douglas (English, ADV)
 The Rez Boa Dogs are led by Inuyama. They are forced into battle with Ikki due to interference by Simca. Inuyama is a close friend of Gonzo, and he wears a helmet shaped like the head of a Doberman dog. He slams his opponents with the tip of his helmet (or sometimes just with his impossibly hard hair), doing surprisingly major damage. His team is defeated and disbanded, and he continues to support Ikki afterward. Inuyama bears an almost identical appearance to Ryu from Shaman King.
Inuyama voiced by: Kazunari Tanaka (Japanese); John Gremillion (English, ADV)
 The Sabel Tigers are a team led by Natsumi Iriya. They take over the area around Ikki's school after the Night Kings are defeated and Kogarasumaru challenges them to obtain it. Natsumi attempts to use feminine charm in order to defeat Ikki, though he just ignores her. She develops a crush on him afterward. The team disbands and later reforms as the Pink Panthers.
Natsumi voiced by: Mayu Asada (Japanese); Alice Fulks (English, ADV)
 The Kintetsu Bulls are an A-class team that wishes to turn professional and serve as inspiration to AT riders around the world. They are led by Tokudawara Gonzō, known as T-Gonzō, who owns a clothing store. He constantly wears a set of heavy weights around his stomach to train himself. His entire team is defeated by Agito, but he is saved from death by Ikki. He supports Ikki and allows his team to have supplies from his store without charge.
 Potemkin is a team consisting of octuplets. They apparently fight to protect the poor inhabitants of an abandoned ship from the government, but actually plan to make a lot of money from selling it. They don't wish to do anything else, so they avoid battles until Kogarasumaru wagers the Fang Regalia, which would make them a lot of money. They are defeated by Kogarasumaru while they are attempting to learn how that crushing the dreams of others is just another part of being a Storm Rider.
 Animal House is a team whose members dress up as apes. They defeat the handicapped Kogarasumaru, and become well known because of it. Om later sneaks onto their team during a rematch and wipes out the members. Kogarasumaru, with Benkei in as a substitute, defeats Om and wins the battle.
 The White Wolf Clan is a team consisting of elderly members of a company. The team was formed in order to save it from bankruptcy. The leader is Kururu's father, who challenges Kogarasumaru in order to use the teenagers for marketing. The team uses a highly sophisticated computer system and team of analysts in order to create the best tactics, though Kogarasumaru manages to overcome them. Kogarasumaru loses after Kururu and other members of Tool Toul To help the White Wolf Clan, as a means of giving Kogarasumaru a wake-up call to bring out its true power by teaching them how to lose honorably. The White Wolf Clan decides to destroy the deal they had and retire after winning.
 Jiggy and Sleipnir are two A-class teams who recently joined forces to take on Kogarasumaru in the third round of the Gram Scale tournament. The former is a team specializing in D-Class matches, like Behemoth; the latter team is composed of 4 king-level Wing Road riders with a Norse mythology theme (hence their name). Originally, Kogarasumaru was slated to fight Jiggy alone, but Sleipnir, the favorite to win the tournament, intervened. All Sleipnir riders are "Wind road" riders and are all Brain chargers like Lind, but in the process they lost their original personalities.

Other characters
The Gravity Children are distinguished by cross-shaped marks on their pupils, and they are well adapted to the Zero Gravity inside the Trophaeum. After some of the originals, Falco, Black Burn, Spitfire, Dontores, Kilik, Simca, Sora, Nike, Rune, Om and Gabishi, escape from the laboratory where they were essentially created, another generation made out of Ringo, Ume, Mikan, Orca, and Nue appear. Ringo, Ume, and Mikan are given to Rika by Minami. He also leads the Brain Charger project, a less expensive alternative to the Gravity Children. It is a possibility that Ikki is a Gravity Child, as he was also given to Rika, when she was about 8, by Uncle Minami. You find out in chapter 295 that his name is Rinta Minami. He is killed by the Tower's elevator while trying to escape.
 Kaito Wanijima Voiced by: Hikaru Midorikawa (Japanese); Illich Guardiola (English, ADV)  Known as the "Shinjuku Crocodile", he is Akito/Agito's older brother and the leader of the Windstorm G-Men, a special SWAT team that was created specifically for hunting down and arresting Storm Rider teams. They use special ATs that are hidden in their pant legs and form around their footwear. Kaito views his brother purely as a tool, constantly keeping him in a cage and punishing him with a bullwhip and a gun that fires rubber bullets. Lind Wanijima, the "original" personality of Akito and Agito's body, is frequently hinted to be very similar to Kaito. In chapters 290-291 it is suspected that he is Gazelle, but 292 reveals that Lind is actually Gazelle. And in chapter 300, be discovered that Kaito is Akito/Agito's father. 
  Voiced by: Noriko Shitaya (Japanese); Nancy Novotny (English, ADV), Emily Woo Zeller (English, Animax Asia)  A teacher, called Tom-Tom or Ton-chan by her students, who frequently interacts with Kogarasumaru. She is constantly paranoid that she will be molested or raped by her students or other random people (though she doesn't seem as bothered by this as she ought to, sometimes). Despite this, she wears very revealing clothing and often performs perverted actions unknowingly. 
 Voiced by: Tomoyuki Dan (Japanese); David Wald (English, ADV)  The academic head of Higashi Junior High-school, who constantly tries to discipline Ikki and his team. He has a soft spot for Tomita Mari, one of his first students and currently his fellow teacher, and constantly encourages her to be stronger and more stern with her own students. He is close to the principal of the school and has a connection to the AT world. It has been hinted that he once sported ATs himself.

References

Air Gear